Mohamed Gouaida (born 15 May 1993) is a Tunisian professional footballer who plays as a winger for Belgian club Virton.

Club career
Gouaida joined Hamburger SV in 2014 from SC Freiburg. He made his Bundesliga debut at 23 November 2014 in the Nordderby against Werder Bremen. He played the entire game, which ended in a 2–0 home win for Hamburg.

References

1993 births
People from Sfax
Footballers from Strasbourg
French people of Tunisian descent
Living people
French footballers
Tunisian footballers
Tunisia international footballers
Association football forwards
SC Freiburg II players
Hamburger SV players
Hamburger SV II players
Karlsruher SC players
FC St. Gallen players
SV Sandhausen players
SV Waldhof Mannheim players
R.E. Virton players
Bundesliga players
2. Bundesliga players
3. Liga players
Regionalliga players
Oberliga (football) players
Swiss Super League players
Swiss 1. Liga (football) players
Challenger Pro League players
Tunisian expatriate footballers
Tunisian expatriate sportspeople in Germany
Expatriate footballers in Germany
Tunisian expatriate sportspeople in Switzerland
Expatriate footballers in Switzerland
Tunisian expatriate sportspeople in Belgium
Expatriate footballers in Belgium